William L. Perkins (died 1957) was an American architect of Chariton, Iowa.  His career is documented in a National Park Service study, "Architectural Career of William L. Perkins in Iowa:1917-1957 MPS".

Among his works are:
Carl L. Caviness Post 102, American Legion, 201 S. Main St., Chariton, Iowa, NRHP-listed
Chariton City Hall and Fire Station, 115 S. Main St., Chariton, Iowa, NRHP-listed
Chariton Herald-Patriot Building, 815 Braden Ave., Chariton, Iowa, NRHP-listed
Chariton Masonic Temple, 821 Armory Ave., Chariton, Iowa, NRHP-listed
Hotel Charitone, 831 Braden Ave., Chariton, Iowa, NRHP-listed
Williamson School, 301 Williamson Ave., Williamson, Iowa, NRHP-listed

References

Architects from Iowa
People from Chariton, Iowa
1957 deaths
Year of birth missing